Edwards Creek is a stream in the U.S. state of Nevada.

Edwards Creek has the name of an early settler.

References

Rivers of Churchill County, Nevada